Jason Enloe (born July 16, 1974) is an American professional golfer who played on the Nationwide Tour.

Enloe was born in Decatur, Illinois. He attended Southern Methodist University and turned professional in 1997.

Enloe has never played in a PGA Tour event, but has won twice on the Nationwide Tour, once in 2006 and another in 2009.

Enloe was head coach of SMU from 2014 to 2019.

Amateur wins (2)
1996 Monroe Invitational, Northeast Amateur

Professional wins (2)

Nationwide Tour wins (2)

Nationwide Tour playoff record (2–0)

U.S. national team appearances
Eisenhower Trophy: 1996

External links

American male golfers
SMU Mustangs men's golfers
PGA Tour golfers
Golfers from Illinois
Golfers from Dallas
Sportspeople from Decatur, Illinois
1974 births
Living people